The Stockbridge School of Agriculture offers Associate of Science, Bachelor of Science, and graduate degrees as an academic unit of the University of Massachusetts Amherst campus. It was founded as part of the Massachusetts Agricultural College (now University of Massachusetts Amherst) in 1918. 

The school's main facility and school symbol is Stockbridge Hall, named after Levi Stockbridge, a founder of Massachusetts Agricultural College and its first professor of agriculture; however, its faculty occupies various buildings on the University of Massachusetts campus, including Agricultural Engineering, Bowditch, Clark, Fernald, French, Stockbridge, and West Experiment Station. Research, education, and extension activities occur at the UMass Cold Spring Orchard Research & Education Center, the Hadley Farm (Stockbridge Stables), the Joseph Troll Turf Research Center, the UMass Vegetable & Agronomy Research Farm, and the CNS Greenhouses.

Degrees
The following Associate of Science degrees are available at Stockbridge:

 Arboriculture and Community Forest Management
 Equine Management
 Sustainable Food & Farming
 Sustainable Horticulture 
 Landscape Contracting
 Turfgrass Management

The following Bachelor of Science Degrees are available:

 Sustainable Food & Farming
 Sustainable Horticulture
 Turfgrass Science & Management
 Plant, Soil, & Insect Sciences

The following graduate degrees are offered:

 M.S. and Ph.D. in Plant Biology
 M.S. and Ph.D. in Organismic & Evolutionary Biology
 M.S. and Ph.D. in Molecular & Cellular Biology
 M.S. in Soil Science

Athletics 
Stockbridge has two National Junior College Athletic Association (NJCAA) teams: basketball and golf. As a two–year school, its students are not allowed by the NCAA to play on varsity teams. Stockbridge teams compete against small four-year schools, preparatory schools, and community colleges. Stockbridge students may try out for the Intercollegiate Horse Show Association equestrian team and Intercollegiate Dressage Association team. These teams compete throughout the year with other colleges in the Northeast. Students may also take advantage of many noncompetitive recreational opportunities or participate in the University of Massachusetts' intramural program, one of the largest in the East.

Greek life 
Alpha Tau Gamma is the social and academic fraternity of the Stockbridge School of Agriculture. Their Chapter House is located at 118 Sunset Avenue on several acres of land near the Southwest dormitories.
There has been at several time throughout the history of the Stockbridge School of Agriculture a sorority Sigma Sigma Alpha. They are currently not active on campus.

Notable alumni 
 James Underwood Crockett, producer and host of the public television show The Victory Garden

Accreditation 
Stockbridge is accredited through the New England Association of Schools and Colleges

See also
Stockbridge Hall

References

External links 
 Stockbridge School of Agriculture official site
 Stockbridge Alumni Association

Agriculture in Massachusetts
University of Massachusetts Amherst schools
Educational institutions established in 1870
University subdivisions in Massachusetts
Agricultural universities and colleges in the United States
Forestry education
1870 establishments in Massachusetts